Saint-Augustin is a parish municipality in the Maria-Chapdelaine Regional County Municipality in the Saguenay–Lac-Saint-Jean region of Quebec, Canada. The municipality had a population of 351 as of the Canada 2016 Census.

Demographics 

Population trend:
 Population in 2016: 351 (2011 to 2016 population change: -12.3%)
 Population in 2011: 400 (2006 to 2011 population change: 1.8%)
 Population in 2006: 393
 Population in 2001: 424
 Population in 1996: 486
 Population in 1991: 534

Mother tongue:
 English as first language: 0%
 French as first language: 100%
 English and French as first language: 0%
 Other as first language: 0%

References

External links

Parish municipalities in Quebec
Incorporated places in Saguenay–Lac-Saint-Jean
Maria-Chapdelaine Regional County Municipality